Jeannine Edwards (born March 12, 1964) is a former ESPN/ABC sportscaster focusing on college football, college basketball and horse racing.

Early career
Edwards began her career at the racetrack in Maryland as a jockey and trainer before being hired by ESPN in 1995. Her first television experience was as an in-track host at Pimlico Race Course and Laurel Park beginning in 1993.

ESPN
Edwards began her career at ESPN as a horse racing analyst.  She became a general assignment reporter for SportsCenter in 2000. Shortly thereafter, she began sideline reporting for college football and college basketball, which she continued on ESPN/ABC through her retirement at the end of 2017.

On December 29, 2017, Edwards retired after her 22-year career at ESPN, which ended with the Cotton Bowl.

Personal life
On February 17, 2013, Edwards became engaged to Oklahoma State Cowboys football defensive coordinator Glenn Spencer. Edwards and Spencer later married on July 12, 2013.

References

College basketball announcers in the United States
American television sports announcers
1964 births
Living people
People from Tenafly, New Jersey
College football announcers
American horse racing announcers
Women sports announcers